Espostoa lanata (= Wooly Espostoa) is a species of cactus of the genus Espostoa.

Its common names are Peruvian old man cactus, cotton ball cactus, snowball cactus, snowball old man.

Habitat 
Its original habitat is from southern Ecuador to the northern Peru on the west slopes of the Andes mountains.

Description 
Espostoa lanata is a columnar cactus. It looks like Cephalocereus senilis (the Old Man of Mexico) : it is a densely hairy species, covered by a warm woolly coat and well adapted to high altitudes. The main difference is the presence of sharp spines on Espostoa. It is widespread in its habitat and quite variable in size and spines, and for this reason it has received several names.
 
The plant is a column up to 7 meters tall in the wild, but only 3 meters when cultivated. The diameter is from 5 to 20 cm. There are 18 to 25 ribs. The ribs and the sharp are mainly hidden by tissue woolly. It branches only after several years.

It flowers at night from a lateral cephalium after several years.

Woolly hairs have been used for pillow filling in Peru.

Subspecies
 Espostoa lanata subsp. lanata
 Espostoa lanata subsp. huanucoensis  synonym Espostoa huanucoensis 
 Espostoa lanata subsp. lanianuligera  synonym Espostoa lanianuligera 
 Espostoa lanata subsp. ruficeps  synonym Espostoa ruficeps

Cultivation 
Source : 
Espostoa lanata is easy to grow. It needs fertile and well-drained soil. In summer, water the plants well but allow them to dry before watering again. Use monthly a fertilizer for cacti.

In winter, keep it dry and the temperature may be as low as −12 °C, but it is better to keep it without frost.

The exposure must be sunny in summer and at least luminous in winter.

In favorable conditions (sun, water, large place), it can grow 20 cm every year.

Notes and references

References

External links 
  http://www.cactus-art.biz/schede/ESPOSTOA/Espostoa_lanata/Espostoa_lanata/Espostoa_lanata.htm

Trichocereeae
Flora of Ecuador
Flora of Peru